Yerlykovo (Yärlekäw) is a rural locality (a selo) in Miyakinsky Selsoviet, Miyakinsky District, Bashkortostan, Russia. The population was 499 as of 2010. There are 6 streets.

Geography 
Yerlykovo is located 3 km southeast of Kirgiz-Miyaki (the district's administrative centre) by road. Kirgiz-Miyaki is the nearest rural locality.

References 

Rural localities in Miyakinsky District